Nepalis in Germany consists of immigrants, refugees and expatriates from Nepal as well as German people of Nepalese descent. Most of them live in  large cities like  Munich,  Frankfurt,  Hamburg and Berlin. However they are spread all over Germany.  Nepalese living in Germany have basically three different backgrounds: (a) Those who came as au-pair and student, (b) Those who  arrived german on the basis of familie reunion and (c) those who have been arrived as refugees.

Migration History
Hundreds of Nepalis emigrated from Nepal to Germany to seek political asylum, fleeing persecution either from the Maoists or police. A small number of Nepalese entrepreneurs and international students have also migrated to Germany for business and further education.

Distribution

Munich
There are around 200 Nepalis living in and around Munich and there is also a small but thriving community of students studying medicine, language and other subjects. There is also a Nepalese restaurant in Munich known as "Yak & Yeti - Himalayan Food House" as well as a Nepalese school.

Munich is also home to a Nepalese temple garden known as the Pagoda Nepal.  The center of the garden is a hand carved pagoda. As in Nepal, the nine-meter-high pagoda stands on a plateau. The temple figures that flanked the staircase are issued just as the temple bell in the pagoda.

Elsewhere
Other cities with significant Nepalese populations include Berlin, Hamburg and Göttingen.

Organizations
Nepali Samaj, Germany is a Nepalese community organization in Germany. The organization was established in April 2003 by the group of young Nepalese in Germany along with the friends of Nepal in Germany.

Other organizations include the NRN-NCC-Germany and SONOG (Students of Nepalese Origin in Germany).

Notable people
 Zascha Moktan - Nepalese-German singer, pianist and guitarist
 Ram Pratap Thapa - Honorary Consul General to Germany at Cologne and chairman of German-Nepalese society

See also
 Nepalis in Austria
 Hinduism in Germany
 Buddhism in Germany

References

External links
 Nepali Samaj, Germany
 Non Resident Nepali Association, Germany
 SONOG - Students of Nepalese Origin in Germany
 Nepalese Society in Göttingen, Germany
 Nepalese Students Society Germany

Asian diaspora in Germany
Germany